Marshallton can refer to:

Marshallton, Northumberland County, Pennsylvania
Marshallton, Chester County, Pennsylvania
Marshallton, Delaware